MBC TV is an Odia-language 24-hour satellite news channel based in Odisha. The channel was launched on 9 May 2011. It has its headquarters in Bhubaneswar.

See also
List of Odia-language television channels
List of television stations in India

External links

Television channels and stations established in 2011
Odia-language television channels
Television stations in Bhubaneswar
Companies based in Bhubaneswar
2011 establishments in Odisha